Secularist of the Year, also known as the Irwin Prize, is an award presented annually by the National Secular Society in "recognition of an individual or an organisation considered to have made an outstanding contribution to the secularist movement." The award was established in 2005.

The prize consists of a trophy, the "Golden Ammonite", and a cheque for £5000. It was first awarded in 2005 and is sponsored by humanist and secularist campaigner Dr. Michael Irwin. The award ceremony normally takes place in London in March.

List of recipients

See also 
 List of religion-related awards

Notes

References 

Secularism
Religion-related awards
Awards established in 2005